Sergei Verenkin (born 8 September 1979) is a Russian former ice hockey left winger. He was selected 223rd overall by the Ottawa Senators in the 1998 NHL Entry Draft.

Verenkin played in the Russian Superleague for Torpedo Yaroslavl, Metallurg Novokuznetsk and Molot-Prikamye Perm.

External links

1979 births
Living people
HC Khimik Voskresensk players
Lokomotiv Yaroslavl players
Metallurg Novokuznetsk players
Molot-Prikamye Perm players
Ottawa Senators draft picks
People from Angarsk
Russian ice hockey forwards
Yermak Angarsk players
Sportspeople from Irkutsk Oblast